What I Call Life is a young adult novel by Jill Wolfson. It was first published in 2005 by Henry Holt and Company Publishers. The novel is about a pre-teen girl entering the social welfare system. She is taken away from her mother and placed in a group home.

Plot introduction

Cal Lavender is perfectly happy living her anonymous life, even if she does have to play mother to her own mother a whole lot more than an eleven-year-old should have to do. But when Cal's mother has one of her “unfortunate episodes” in the middle of the public library, she is whisked off by the authorities, and Cal is escorted to a seat in the back of a police car.

On “just a short, temporary detour from what I call life,” Cal fids herself in a crazy group home with four other girls, watched over by a strange old stuttering woman that everyone refers to as the Knitting Lady. At first, Cal can think of nothing but how to get out of this nuthouse. She knows she does not belong there. It turns out that all the girls, and even the Knitting Lady, may have a lot more in common that they could have imagined.
Cal is constantly thinking that her mother is coming to get her quite soon, but, as it turns out, it takes quite a while for her mother to come and "free" Cal from the group home.

The four other girls at the group home are: Amber- The quiet, and almost bald, shy one who does not talk for the whole beginning of the book; Monica- The whiny, annoying one; Fern- The one who laughs at almost anything Whitney says; and Whitney- The girl who has had so much done to her, she made a list. For example, # 14.: Got dropped on head by Santa at a group home party. Whitney is probably the most important girl living in the group home with Cal. The five of them go off to find Whitney's sister, but, in the end, Cal discovers that this "sister" doesn't exist at all, and the only other ones who know about it are Amber & Whitney herself. Whitney also has a pet pill bug named Ike Eisenhower the 5th, whose brother, Mike the 5th, died already.

Throughout the book, the Knitting Lady (whose name is revealed at the very end) tells them a story about a young girl named Lillian who went on an "Orphan Train" in the early 1900s.  She finally tells them that, when Lillian grew up, she had a daughter named Brenda who was dropped off at a group home, just like Cal.
Eventually, Betty (Cal's mother) comes and takes Cal back home. Cal never hears from Whitney, Amber, Monica, Fern nor the Knitting Lady again, but they remain in her heart.

Awards and recognition
Booklist Top 10 First Novels for Youth 2005
Junior Library Guild Selection
Maine Student Book Award Selection

References

2005 American novels
American young adult novels
Henry Holt and Company books